The bridge across the Amur River (in Komsomolsk-on-Amur) is a road-rail bridge across the Amur River near the city of Komsomolsk-on-Amur. The bridge has a single-rail track and two-lane highway that allows to completely divide cars and other vehicles from trains. The bridge carries also a single-circuit 220 kV-powerline.

Train service on the bridge began in 1975, while automobile traffic — in 1981. The bridge is part of the railroad line Komsomolsk-on-Amur — Sovetskaya Gavan, and of the highway of regional significance R454 Khabarovsk — Komsomolsk-on-Amur.

History 
From June to September 1932, the first survey of the bridge across the Amur River on the future Baikal-Amur Mainline was conducted around the city of Komsomolsk-on-Amur that was under construction then. An exploration team of experts from the Institute Lengiprotransmost offered three main options for the crossing up to the village of Pivan' within the future city: above, below and within the city limits.

Before the bridge was opened to traffic, a regular ferry service had operated there. After launching the railway line Khabarovsk — Komsomolsk-on-Amur — Sovetskaya Gavan, cars had to cross the Amur River by railway ferries Project 723, Volga (until 1952 — The ferry number 1), Don (until 1952 — The ferry number 2), Amur and Komsomolsk. 

During the winter months, temporary rails were usually laid on the ice itself, using long sleepers to distribute the weight of passing rolling stock as evenly as possible. Since 1961, the ferries were driven by icebreakers in order to extend the navigation in autumn and winter.

Construction of the bridge began in 1969. In October 1974, the last pier was erected (they were nine in all). The installation of the last span was finished on 1 August 1975. 

On 26 September 1975, the main bridge of the Baikal-Amur Mainline was solemnly opened to rail traffic. At midday, a passenger train from the station of Komsomolsk-on-Amur passed the first portal of the new bridge. The ferries that had operated there for more than 30 years said goodbye to Amur by emitting a series of long beeps.

Design 
A project for the future bridge was developed in 1970 by the design institute "Lengiprotransmost" (LGTM) at the request of the USSR Transport Construction Ministry. The truss superstructure was designed for class S-14 loading, while the two-lane highway ― for class NC-80 and N-30 loading in compliance with the current building standards. The bridge's superstructure components were designed for arctic service in the zone A.

The construction works were carried out by the Komsomolsk work team MO-26 of the company Mostostroy-8. In fact, two spans of the single-rail track and two-lane highway are resting on the common ferro-concrete supports (pylons). The spans of the two-lane highway (on the downstream side) rest on the ends of the cantilever arms.

The total length of the bridge, including approaches from abutment to abutment, is 1,435.32 metres. The height of the bridge from the surface of water is 24 metres. A catchment area is 1,730,000 km2.

During the construction period between 1970 and 1971, the method of Prof. Konstantin Silin (1913–1996) was used for the first time in domestic practice of bridge building for erecting pylons on the foundations of ferro-concrete sheaths with a diameter of 3 metres that excluded the use of caissons that had been traditionally used in the construction of large and road-rail bridges along the Trans-Siberian railway.

For anchoring the ferro-concrete sheaths into bedrocks, the reactive turbo-drilling method was applied for the first time in the world practice of bridge building. For this purpose, the reactive turbodrilling machine of RTB-600 series was used. It consisted of three turbodrilling heads for providing rotation of a rock-cutting tool in the form of roller cones.

After immersing the sheaths up to the design mark, they were filled with concrete by the tremie method. Thereafter, the sheaths were combined by a reinforced concrete slab with the use of sheet pile fencing, on which the piers' bodies were set in.

The foundations of intermediate supports were manufactured of ferro-concrete sheaths with a diameter of 3 metres to a unified design by Lengiprotransmost with the use of concrete of Class М400 (B30) on durability and of Class F300 on frost resistance, filled with underwater hydraulic monolithic concrete of Class M200 (B15). In the cavity of the sheaths, reinforcing cages of rebar with a strength grade up to A-I and A-II were pre-installed (steel grades St5sp and St3sp) with diameters of 10-20 mm. In total, 304 sheaths were immersed during the construction.

The intermediate supports are massive prefabricated monolithic structures. They were dressed with granite slabs from the edges of the foundations up to the high-water level area and equipped with pointed ends on the upstream side serving as cutwaters (starlings) equipped with a vertical cutting surface. The granite used for facing the bridge's piers was quarried from the Kiesovsky and Trikratninsky deposits.

Military outposts 
The bridge is an important nodal point on the Baikal-Amur Mainline and a strategic-military site. There are barbed wire entanglements into different rows, pillboxes, control towers on the left and right river banks near the bridge. Pedestrians and bicycles are forbidden on the bridge (other than in an organized column). Once there was also a military unit on the left bank that had a reduced copy of the bridge used for exercises.

See also
Khabarovsk Bridge
Trans-Siberian Railway

References

Railway bridges in Russia
Truss bridges
Road bridges in Russia
Bridges completed in 1916
1916 establishments in the Russian Empire
Buildings and structures in Khabarovsk Krai
Transport in the Russian Far East
Bridges built in the Soviet Union
Bridges over the Amur
Transport in Khabarovsk Krai
Rail transport in Khabarovsk Krai